Haissem Ben Halima is a paralympic athlete from Tunisia competing mainly in category F37 DT events.

Haissem has competed in the discus at the 2000 and 2004 Summer Paralympics winning the silver medal in the F37 class in 2004.

References

Paralympic athletes of Tunisia
Athletes (track and field) at the 2004 Summer Paralympics
Athletes (track and field) at the 2008 Summer Paralympics
Paralympic silver medalists for Tunisia
Living people
Medalists at the 2004 Summer Paralympics
Tunisian male discus throwers
Year of birth missing (living people)
Paralympic medalists in athletics (track and field)
21st-century Tunisian people